Nohea is a genus of fungi in the family Halosphaeriaceae. This is a monotypic genus, containing the single species Nohea umiumi.

References

External links
Nohea at Index Fungorum

Microascales
Monotypic Sordariomycetes genera